Vincent Kriechmayr (born 1 October 1991) is an Austrian World Cup alpine ski racer and specializes in the speed events of super-G and downhill.

Kriechmayr is the 2021 world champion in both speed events, super-G and downhill.

Career
Born in Linz, Upper Austria, Kriechmayr made his World Cup debut in December 2010 at age nineteen. He achieved his first World Cup podium in March 2015, a runner-up finish in super-G at Kvitfjell, Norway. He achieved his first World Cup victory in a super-G in December 2017 at Beaver Creek, Colorado. His fourth World Cup victory came in the classic downhill at Wengen in 2019.

At the World Championships in 2021 at Cortina d'Ampezzo, Kriechmayr won both the super-G and the downhill, becoming the third male to take the speed double at the Worlds, after Hermann Maier in 1999 and Bode Miller in 2005. He won the super-G season title in 2021, 83 points ahead of runner-up Marco Odermatt; the super-G at the World Cup finals in Lenzerheide was cancelled due to fog. In October 2021 Kriechmayr was named Austrian sportsman of the year for 2021.

World Cup results

Season titles
 1 title  – (1 Super-G)

Season standings

Race podiums
 15 wins – (8 DH, 7 SG)
 31 podiums – (13 DH, 18 SG)

World Championship results

Olympic results

References

External links

Vincent Kriechmayr at the Austrian Ski team official site 

Austrian male alpine skiers
Living people
1991 births
Alpine skiers at the 2018 Winter Olympics
Alpine skiers at the 2022 Winter Olympics
Olympic alpine skiers of Austria
Sportspeople from Linz
20th-century Austrian people
21st-century Austrian people